The Secret Kingdom is a 1925 British silent fantasy and science fiction film directed by Sinclair Hill and starring Matheson Lang, Stella Arbenina and Eric Bransby Williams. It is an adaptation of the novel The Hidden Fire by Bertram Atkey. The screenplay concerns a wealthy man who acquires a mind-reading machine but is soon horrified to discover what people are really thinking. It was shot at Cricklewood Studios in London.

It was reissued in 1929 under the alternative title of Beyond the Veil.

Cast
 Matheson Lang as John Quarrain 
 Stella Arbenina as Mary Quarrain 
 Eric Bransby Williams as Philip Darent 
 Genevieve Townsend as The Secretary 
 Rudolph de Cordova as The Protege 
 Robin Irvine as The Son 
 Lilian Oldland as The Daughter 
 Frank Goldsmith as Henry

References

Bibliography
 Low, Rachael. History of the British Film, 1918-1929. George Allen & Unwin, 1971.

External links

1925 films
1920s fantasy films
1920s science fiction films
British science fantasy films
British silent feature films
1920s English-language films
Stoll Pictures films
Films shot at Cricklewood Studios
Films based on British novels
British black-and-white films
Films directed by Sinclair Hill
1920s British films
Silent fantasy films
Silent science fiction films